Franklin A. "Frank" Leach (February 7, 1826 – May 22, 1893) was an American businessman and politician.

Born in Pamelia, Jefferson County, New York, Leach moved with his parents to Watertown, Wisconsin Territory in 1845. Leach lived on a farm in the town of Utica, Winnebago County, Wisconsin. He was involved with the grocery, dry goods, and hardware businesses in Oshkosh, Wisconsin. Leach served on the Utica Town Board, the Oshkosh Common Council, and was a Republican. In 1874 and 1875, Leach served in the Wisconsin State Assembly. Leach died at his home in Oshkosh, Wisconsin from kidney problems.

Notes

1826 births
1893 deaths
People from Jefferson County, New York
Politicians from Oshkosh, Wisconsin
Businesspeople from Wisconsin
Wisconsin city council members
19th-century American politicians
People from Utica, Winnebago County, Wisconsin
19th-century American businesspeople
Republican Party members of the Wisconsin State Assembly